is the 44th single by the Japanese idol girl group AKB48. It was released in Japan on June 1, 2016. It was number-one on the Oricon Weekly Singles Chart with 1,441,000 copies sold. The song also reached number-one on the Billboard Japan Hot 100. It was the best-selling single of 2016 in Japan, with 2.507 million copies according to Billboard Japan and 1,519,387 copies according to Oricon.

Background
The single marks the first time Mion Mukaichi holds the center position in the choreography for the title track of a single by AKB48. It will also be the first time for NMB48 member  to participate in the title track of a single by AKB48. Tsubasa wa Iranai is the last AKB48 single to feature NMB48 member Miyuki Watanabe, prior to her departure from the AKB48 group in August 2016. Shizuka Oya, who didn’t participate in any A-Sides since Suzukake Nanchara, made her first management-chosen senbatsu appearance in this single.

The "Theater Edition" of the single will feature  a new song by NGT48. The song is titled "Kimi wa Doko ni Iru?" and will be the main theme of the upcoming TV drama series adaptation of Higurashi When They Cry, to be premiered from May 20 on BS Sky PerfecTV!.

Release
The single was released in several versions: Type A (two editions: limited and regular), Type B (limited and regular), Type C (limited and regular) and a version called the "Theater Edition". All versions, except the Theater Edition, include a DVD with several music videos.

The first presses of the single came with a ticket to vote in the AKB48 45th Single Senbatsu Election (to choose the members to be featured in the AKB48 45th Single).

Track listings

Type A 
All lyrics by Yasushi Akimoto.

Type B

Type C

Theater Edition

Personnel

Tsubasa wa Iranai 
The center (choreography center) is Mion Mukaichi.

 AKB48 Team A: Anna Iriyama, Shizuka Ōya, Haruna Kojima, Haruka Shimazaki, Yui Hiwatashi, Miho Miyazaki, Yui Yokoyama
 AKB48 Team A/Team 8: Nanami Yamada
 AKB48 Team A/NMB48 Team M: Miru Shiroma
 AKB48 Team A/HKT48 Team KIV: Sakura Miyawaki
 AKB48 Team K: Minami Minegishi, Mion Mukaichi, Tomu Mutō
 AKB48 Team K/NMB48 Team N: Sayaka Yamamoto
 AKB48 Team K/HKT48 Team H: Haruka Kodama
 AKB48 Team B: Ryōka Ōshima, Rena Katō, Yuria Kizaki, Mayu Watanabe
 AKB48 Team B/NGT48 Team NIII: Yuki Kashiwagi
 AKB48 Team 4: Nana Okada, Saya Kawamoto, Mako Kojima, Juri Takahashi
 AKB48 Team 4/SKE48 Team S: Ryoha Kitagawa
 SKE48 Team S: Jurina Matsui
 SKE48 Team E: Rara Gotō
 NMB48 Team N: Ririka Sutō
 HKT48 Team H: Rino Sashihara
 NGT48 Team NIII: Minami Kato, Rie Kitahara, Moeka Takakura

Set Me Free 
Sung by Team A members.

 AKB48 Team A: Anna Iriyama, Shizuka Ōya, Nana Ōwada, Mayu Ogasawara, Natsuki Kojima, Haruna Kojima, Yukari Sasaki, Haruka Shimazaki, Miru Shiroma, Kayoko Takita, Megu Taniguchi, Chiyori Nakanishi, Mariko Nakamura, Rina Hirata, Yui Hiwatashi, Ami Maeda, Miho Miyazaki, Sakura Miyawaki, Nanami Yamada, Yui Yokoyama

Koi o Suru to Baka o Miru 
Sung by Team B members.

 AKB48 Team B: Ayano Umeta, Ryōka Ōshima, Yuki Kashiwagi, Rena Katō, Yuria Kizaki, Moe Gotō, Nagisa Sakaguchi, Miyu Takeuchi, Makiho Tatsuya, Miku Tanabe, Seina Fukuoka, Ma Chia-ling, Nako Yabuki, Aeri Yokoshima, Mayu Watanabe, Miyuki Watanabe (Last Single)

Kangaeru Hito 
Sung by Team 4 members.

 AKB48 Team 4: Miyabi Iino, Rina Izuta, Saho Iwatate, Rio ŌKawa, Miyū Ōmori, Ayaka Okada, Nana Okada, Saya Kawamoto, Ryōha Kitagawa, Saki Kitazawa, Mako Kojima, Haruka Komiyama, Kiara Satō, Nagisa Shibuya, Juri Takahashi, Mio Tomonaga, Miki Nishino, Rena Nozawa, Yuiri Murayama

Aishū no Trumpeter 
Sung by Team K members.

 AKB48 Team K: Moe Aigasa, Maria Abe, Haruka Ishida, Manami Ichikawa, Haruka Kodama, Ayana Shinozaki, Haruka Shimada, Hinana Shimoguchi, Mariya Suzuki, Yūka Tano, Chisato Nakata, Ikumi Nakano, Nana Fujita, Minami Minegishi, Mion Mukaichi, Tomu Mutō, Shinobu Mogi, Sayaka Yamamoto, Ami Yumoto

Yume e no Route 
Sung by Team 8 members.

 AKB48 Team 8: Nagisa Sakaguchi, Yui Yokoyama, Hijiri Tanikawa, Nanami Satō, Tsumugi Hayasaka, Akari Satō, Kasumi Mougi, Rin Okabe, Hitomi Honda, Maria Shimizu, Ayane Takahashi, Nanase Yoshikawa, Yui Oguri, Erina Oda, Shiori Satō, Ayaka Hidaritomo, Natsuki Fujimura, Yuri Yokomichi, Yūna Hattori, Ai Yamamoto, Haruna Hashimoto, Reina Kita, Kurena Chō, Moeri Kondō, Serika Nagano, Nao Ōta, Nanami Yamada, Ruka Yamamoto, Momoka Ōnishi, Sayuna Hama, Ikumi Nakano, Mei Abe, Kotone Hitomi, Yūri Tani, Miu Shitao, Riona Hamamatsu, Yurina Gyōten, Kaoru Takaoka, Natsuki Hirose, Karen Yoshida, Rena Fukuchi, Moeka Iwasaki, Narumi Kuranoo, Miyu Yoshino, Moka Yaguchi, Karin Shimoaoki, Rira Miyazato

Kimi wa Doko ni Iru? 
Sung by NGT48 members.

 NGT48: Yuria Ōtaki, Yuka Ogino, Tsugumi Oguma, Yuki Kashiwagi, Minami Katō, Yuria Kado, Rie Kitahara, Aina Kusakabe, Anju Satō, Riko Sugahara, Reina Seiji, Moeka Takakura, Mau Takahashi, Ayaka Tano, Rika Nakai, Ayuka Nakamura, Miharu Nara, Marina Nishigata, Nishimura Nanako, Rena Hasegawa, Hinata Honma, Ayaka Mizusawa, Aya Miyajima, Fūka Murakumo, Maho Yamaguchi, Noe Yamada

Charts

Release history

Further reading

References

External links
 Type A Limited Edition — AKB48 discography on the official website

AKB48 songs
2016 singles
2016 songs
Songs with lyrics by Yasushi Akimoto
King Records (Japan) singles
Oricon Weekly number-one singles
Billboard Japan Hot 100 number-one singles